The Aral Formation is a geologic formation in Kazakhstan. It preserves fossils dating back to the Neogene period. Much of its fossils consist of Glires and fish, though cetaceans and cryptobranchid salamanders are also known.

Paleobiota 
The Aral Formation has yielded a rich variety of extinct mammals. Many of its mammal fauna consists of the clade Glires with rodents being particularly numerous.

Bivalves

Chondrichthyes

Osteichthyes

Urodela

Mammals

Rodents

Lagomorpha

Eulipotyphla

Cetacea

References 

Geologic formations of Kazakhstan